A zuhri or zouhri in Moroccan folklore is a human-djinn hybrid child. Its feminine form is zuhriyya. According to some beliefs, zuhris possess physical and supernatural traits that distinguish them from normal children, and make their blood valuable and sought after for various magical rituals, especially the hunt for old treasures, believed to be hidden or protected by the djinn.

While such superstitions have mostly disappeared in Morocco, or are not taken as seriously as in the past, several instances of violence, kidnapping and even murder of children in Morocco, may be related to attempts at finding hidden treasures using "zuhri" children. They may be subject to kidnapping by human traffickers, to be resold at a hefty price to treasure hunters.

Etymology 
The term "zuhri" may find its origin in the Moroccan Darija word "zher"  meaning "luck", or it may have derived from "Zohar", the name of a book of Kabbalah.

Traits and origin of a Zuhri 
Children believed to be zuhri can have some or all of these physical traits:
A contiunous horizontal line that crosses the palms
A distinctive line or mark on the tongue
Blond or red hair
Blue or green eyes, displaying some dissymmetry
A distinctive mark on the hair or the iris

A zuhri is believed to be either a djinn offspring who was swapped with a human newborn at birth, or a human child who has supernatural abilities, possibly due to being possessed by a djinn from birth.

Rituals 
According to Ahmed Amlik, professor of History at Cadi Ayyad Universiry of Marrakech, people in the past tended to bury their personal or family valuables at hidden locations in forests, or in deep wells, usually during times of turmoil and civil war. Zuhri children are thought to possess psychic abilities or connection to the world of djinns, that can help with finding the hidden treasures buried at those locations, and are therefore used like "magical treasure detectors". The ritual of finding the treasure may involve the recitation of Koranic verses, as well as spilling the blood of the zuhri child. The zuhri may also help with carrying the treasure, since he or she is believed to be less likely to be punished by the djins for stealing their possession. The ritual may end by sacrificing the child and spilling their blood on the treasure, to appease the anger of the djins. In some cases the child is simply abandoned between life and death.

In fiction 
Road To Limbo is a 2022 French-Moroccan movie produced by Marie Gutmann, written by Ayoub Lahnoud, about Taher, a Zouhri child who gets rescued by a man named Rahal, and their adventure together.

References 
 
African demons
Moroccan culture
Jinn
North African legendary creatures
Moroccan Arabic words and phrases
Crime in Morocco